The 2021–22 season was the 55th season in the existence of Heracles Almelo and the club's 24th consecutive season in the top flight of Dutch football. In addition to the domestic league, Heracles Almelo participated in this season's editions of the KNVB Cup.

Players

First-team squad

Out on loan

Transfers

In

Out

Pre-season and friendlies

Competitions

Overall record

Eredivisie

League table

Results summary

Results by round

Matches
The league fixtures were announced on 11 June 2021.

KNVB Cup

References

Heracles Almelo seasons
Heracles Almelo